Usher syndrome type-1G protein is a protein that in humans is encoded by the USH1G gene.

This gene encodes a protein that contains three ankyrin domains, a class I PDZ-binding motif and a sterile alpha motif. The encoded protein interacts with harmonin, which is associated with Usher syndrome type 1C. 

This protein plays a role in the development and maintenance of the auditory and visual systems and functions in the cohesion of hair bundles formed by inner ear sensory cells. Mutations in this gene are associated with Usher syndrome type 1G (USH1G).

References

Further reading

External links
  GeneReviews/NCBI/NIH/UW entry on Usher Syndrome Type I